Henhoaha is a village in the Nicobar district of Andaman and Nicobar Islands, India. It is located on the island of Great Nicobar, near Indira Point, the southernmost point of India.

Administration 

The village comes under the administration of Laxmi Nagar panchayat.

Demographics 

The village lost a number of its residents in the 2004 tsunami. According to the 2011 census of India, Henhoaha (or In-Hig-Loi) does not have any households and is uninhabited.

References 

Villages in Great Nicobar tehsil
Great Nicobar Island